Pattiyage Sunil Soma Peiris (Pattiyage Sunil Soma Peiris, 13 April 1948 – 10 December 2021) was a Sri Lankan screenwriter, actor, editor and filmmaker in Sri Lankan cinema. He was a prolific director who directed the most number of films in Sri Lankan cinema with forty five commercial films in various genres.

Personal life
He was born on 13 April 1948 in Maharagama, Ceylon, as the second child of the family with eight siblings. His father Salaman Peiris, was a businessman and mother was a housewife. He completed education from Buwanekaba Maha Vidyalaya, Maharagama. His school contemporaries are Nuwan Gunawardena, Amarasiri Peiris and Kandupola Kumaratunga.

In 1971, he married his longtime partner, Malani Ayesha Perera. The couple has two sons: Rohana Prema Kumara, Sudesh Wasantha and one daughter, Vasanthika Piyanga Kumuduni. Vasanthika's son Keshan Prasanna is a popular musician. His son Sudesh Wasantha Pieris is also a filmmaker, actor and playback singer of Sinhala cinema. Sudesh's daughter Chamathka is a songstress and playback singer.

Since the 1980s, he suffered minor complications with diabetes. In 2016, his body sugar increased and kidneys failed because of the effects of the drugs that he had taken for diabetes. At that time, he had a kidney transplant. Since 2016, diabetes got worse, where the left leg was cut below the knee and removed. In January 2019,  a part of the right leg was also removed.

Peiris died on 10 December 2021 at his residence at the age of 72.

Career
During school times, he acted in many Vesak dramas conducted in his hometown. Then he joined the drama group of Albert Gurunnanse and acted in Kolam dramas. He entered Sinhala cinema with a minor uncredited role in Henry Chandrawansa's film Vanagatha Kella. Then he made group characters in the films lakseṭa Koḍiya and Vahal Dūpata. While acting in the 1973 film Thushara as a stuntman, he informed the director Yasapalitha Nanayakkara about his passion to become a filmmaker. Therefore, he was finally selected as the second assistant director of the film. After the film, Sunil Soma became the first assistant director of Yasapalitha Nanayakkara and together they completed 18 films.

In 1985, he made his debut cinema direction with Obata Diwura Kiyannam. Then within 25 years, he made forty-five films. Out of the forty five films made by him, eight were co-directed with his son Sudesh Wasantha. In 1986 he co-directed the film Dinuma with Ananda Wickramasinghe. The first seven films (Obaṭa Divurā Kiyannam, Jaya Apaṭai, Mamai Rajā, Raja Wæḍakārayō, Yukthiyaṭa Væḍa, Dinuma and Obaṭai Priyē Aādarē) directed by Sunil Soma were screened for more than 100 days in a row, a record in Sinhala cinema. Also, his film Mamai Raja was screened for more than 200 days, a record in Sinhala film history. In 1993, he directed the Tamil film Sharmilavin Ithaya Ragam. Meanwhile, thirty-eight of his films were produced by Sunil T. Fernando, another record in Sinhala cinema for most number of films by same director-producer collaboration. Also, Sunil Soma is the second Sri Lankan filmmaker to direct films under two names. In some films, he used the name P. S. S. Pieris. (The first filmmaker was K. Venkatasalam who directed films under the name K. Venkat.)

In 1986, he directed the film Obatai Priye Adare which was screened in 1987. Before the assassination of lead actor Vijaya Kumaratunga in February 1987, the film ran 75 days with less income. But after the assassination, the film ran for 130 days and became a blockbuster. On the final day of screening at Ritz Hall, the film crew donated 10 wheelchairs to commemorate Kumaratunga. In 1989, his film Mamai Raja became a blockbuster hit and passed 100 days. After reaching 100 days, producers Sonia Disa and Sunil T. opened two bank books for Kumaratunga's children, Vimukthi and Yashodara and Rs. 25,000 was deposited. Sunil Soma introduced many actors and actresses to the Sinhala film such as: Anoja Weerasinghe, Anusha Damayanthi, Ruwanthi Mangala, Damith Fonseka, Shashi Wijendra, Arjuna Kamalanath and Anarkali Akarsha.

In 1997, he entered active politics where he became a Member of the Maharagama Urban Council.

Filmography

As a director

Other roles

References

External links
 

1949 births
2021 deaths
Sri Lankan film directors
Sri Lankan film editors
Sri Lankan film producers
People from Colombo District